A financial centre (BE), financial center (AE), or financial hub, is a location with a concentration of participants in banking, asset management, insurance or financial markets with venues and supporting services for these activities to take place. Participants can include financial intermediaries (such as banks and brokers), institutional investors (such as investment managers, pension funds, insurers, and hedge funds), and issuers (such as companies and governments). Trading activity can take place on venues such as exchanges and involve clearing houses, although many transactions take place over-the-counter (OTC), that is directly between participants. Financial centres usually host companies that offer a wide range of financial services, for example relating to mergers and acquisitions, public offerings, or corporate actions; or which participate in other areas of finance, such as private equity, hedge funds, and reinsurance. Ancillary financial services include rating agencies, as well as provision of related professional services, particularly legal advice and accounting services.

The International Monetary Fund's classes of major financial centres are: International Financial Centres (IFCs), such as New York City, London and Tokyo; Regional Financial Centres (RFCs), such as Shanghai, Shenzhen, Frankfurt, and Sydney; and Offshore Financial Centres (OFCs), such as Cayman Islands, Dublin, Hong Kong, and Singapore.

International Financial Centres, and many Regional Financial Centres, are full–service financial centres with direct access to large capital pools from banks, insurance companies, investment funds, and listed capital markets, and are major global cities.  Offshore Financial Centres, and also some Regional Financial Centres, tend to specialise in tax-driven services, such as corporate tax planning tools, tax–neutral vehicles, and shadow banking/securitisation, and can include smaller locations (e.g. Luxembourg), or city-states (e.g. Singapore). The IMF notes an overlap between Regional Financial Centres and Offshore Financial Centres (e.g. Hong Kong and Singapore are both Offshore Financial Centres and Regional Financial Centres). Since 2010, academics consider Offshore Financial Centres synonymous with tax havens.

Definitions

FSF–IMF approach

In April 2000, the Financial Stability Forum ("FSF"), concerned about OFCs on global financial stability produced a report listing 42 OFCs. In June 2000, the International Monetary Fund (IMF) published a working paper on OFCs, but which also proposed a taxonomy on classifying the various types of global financial centres, which they listed as follows (with the description and examples they noted as typical of each category, also noted):

The IMF noted that the three categories were not mutually exclusive and that various locations could fall under the definition of an OFC and an RFC, in particular (e.g. Singapore and Hong Kong were cited).

Rationale for OFCs

The IMF noted that OFCs could be set up for legitimate purposes (listing various reasons), but also for what the IMF called dubious purposes, citing tax evasion and money–laundering.  In 2007, the IMF produced the following definition of an OFC: a country or jurisdiction that provides financial services to nonresidents on a scale that is incommensurate with the size and the financing of its domestic economy. The FSF annual reports on global shadow banking use the IMF definition to track the OFCs with the largest financial centres relative to their domestic economies.

Progress from 2000 onwards from IMF–OECD–FATF initiatives on common standards, regulatory compliance, and banking transparency, has reduced the regulatory attraction of OFCs over IFCs and RFCs. Since 2010, academics considered the services of OFCs to be synonymous with tax havens, and use the term OFC and tax haven interchangeably (e.g. the academic lists of tax havens include all the FSF–IMF OFCs).

In July 2017, a study by the University of Amsterdam's CORPNET group, broke down the definition of an OFC into two subgroups, Conduit and Sink OFCs:

  24 Sink OFCs: jurisdictions in which a disproportionate amount of value disappears from the economic system (e.g. the traditional tax havens).
  5 Conduit OFCs: jurisdictions through which a disproportionate amount of value moves toward Sink OFCs (e.g. the corporate–focused tax havens)(Conduits are: Netherlands, United Kingdom, Switzerland, Singapore and Ireland)

Sink OFCs rely on Conduit OFCs to re–route funds from high–tax locations using base erosion and profit shifting ("BEPS") tax planning tools, which are encoded, and accepted, in the Conduit OFC's extensive networks of global bilateral tax treaties.  Because Sink OFCs are more closely associated with traditional tax havens, they tend to have more limited treaty networks and access to global higher–tax locations.

Rankings

Prior to the 1960s, there was little data available to rank financial centres. In recent years many rankings have been developed and published. Two of the most relevant are the Global Financial Centres Index and the Xinhua–Dow Jones International Financial Centres Development Index.

Global Financial Centres Index (2007–ongoing)

The Global Financial Centres Index ("GFCI") is compiled semi-annually by the London-based think tank Z/Yen in conjunction with the Shenzhen-based think tank China Development Institute. As of 24 March 2022, the top global financial centres per the GFCI article containing a ranked list of 119 financial centres were:

Xinhua–Dow Jones Index (2010–2014) 

The Xinhua–Dow Jones International Financial Centers Development Index was compiled annually by the Xinhua News Agency of China with the Chicago Mercantile Exchange and Dow Jones & Company of the United States from 2010 to 2014. During that time New York was the top-ranked centre.

According to the 2014 Xinhua–Dow Jones International Financial Centres Development Index (IFCD), the top ten financial centres in the world were:

(Δ) Appears on the FSF–IMF Offshore Financial Centre (OFC) Lists.
(†) Also appears as one of the top 5 Conduit OFC, in CORPNET's 2017 research; or
(‡) Also appears as one of the top 5 Sink OFC, in CORPNET's 2017 research.

Examples 

Old finance centres such as Amsterdam, London, Paris, and New York have long histories. Today there is a diverse range of financial centres worldwide. While New York and London often stand out as the leading global financial centres, other established financial centres provide significant competition and several newer financial centres are developing. Despite this proliferation of financial centres, academics have discussed evidence showing increasing concentration of financial activity in the largest national and international financial centres in the 21st century. Others have discussed the ongoing dominance of New York and London, and the role linkages between these two financial centres played in the financial crisis of 2007–08.

Comparisons of financial centres focus on their history, role and significance in serving national, regional and international financial activity. Each centre's offering includes differing legal, tax and regulatory environments. One journalist suggested three factors for success as a financial city: "a pool of capital to lend or invest; a decent legal and taxation framework; and high-quality human resources".

Major IMF IFCs

New York, London, and Tokyo are in every list of major IFCs.  Some of the major RFCs (see below), such as Paris, Frankfurt, Chicago, and Shanghai appear as IFCs in some lists.

 New York City. Since the middle of the 20th century, New York City, represented by Wall Street in Manhattan's Financial District, has been described as a leading financial centre. Over the past few decades, with the rise of a multipolar world with new regional powers and global capitalism, numerous financial centres have challenged Wall Street, particularly London and several in Asia, which some analysts believe will be the focus of new worldwide growth. One source described New York as extending its lead as the world's centre of finance in September 2018; according to Reuters, the think-tank New Financial concluded the "raw" value of domestic and international financial activity like managing assets and issuing equity underscored the position of New York as the world's leading financial centre.

New York City remains the largest centre for trading in public equity and debt capital markets, driven in part by the size and financial development of the U.S. economy. The NYSE and NASDAQ are the two largest stock exchanges in the world. New York also leads in hedge fund management; private equity; and the monetary volume of mergers and acquisitions. Several investment banks and investment managers headquartered in New York City are important participants in other financial centres. The New York Federal Reserve Bank, the largest within the Federal Reserve System, regulates financial institutions and implements U.S. monetary policy, which in turn influences the world's economy. The three major global credit rating agencies – Standard and Poor's, Moody's Investor Service, and Fitch Ratings – are headquartered or co–headquartered in New York City, with Fitch being co–headquartered in London.

 London. London has been a leading international financial centre since the 19th century, acting as a centre of lending and investment around the world. English contract law was adopted widely for international finance, with legal services provided in London. Financial institutions located there provided services internationally such as Lloyd's of London (founded 1686) for insurance and the Baltic Exchange (founded 1744) for shipping. During the 20th century London played an important role in the development of new financial products such as the Eurodollar and Eurobonds in the 1960s, international asset management and international equities trading in the 1980s, and derivatives in the 1990s.

London continues to maintain a leading position as a financial centre in the 21st century, and maintains the largest trade surplus in financial services around the world. However, like New York, it faces new competitors including fast-rising eastern financial centres such as Hong Kong and Shanghai. London is the largest centre for derivatives markets, foreign exchange markets, money markets, issuance of international debt securities, international insurance, trading in gold, silver and base metals through the London bullion market and London Metal Exchange, and international bank lending. London has the second largest concentration of hedge funds (847 according to HedgeLists.com). London benefits from its position between the Asia and U.S. time zones, and benefited from its location within the European Union, although this ended on 31 January 2020 when the United Kingdom left the European Union following the Brexit referendum of 2016. As well as the London Stock Exchange, the Bank of England, the second oldest central bank, is in London, although the European Banking Authority moved to Paris after Brexit.

 Tokyo. One report suggests that Japanese authorities are working on plans to transform Tokyo but have met with mixed success, noting that "initial drafts suggest that Japan's economic specialists are having trouble figuring out the secret of the Western financial centres' success." Efforts include more English-speaking restaurants and services and the building of many new office buildings in Tokyo, but more powerful stimuli such as lower taxes have been neglected and a relative aversion to finance remains prevalent in Japan. Tokyo emerged as a major financial centre in the 1980s as the Japanese economy became one of the largest in the world. As a financial centre, Tokyo has good links with New York City and London.

Major IMF OFCs

These centres appear in all FSF–IMF lists of OFCs and, bar the Caribbean OFCs of the Cayman Islands, the British Virgin Islands, and Bermuda, represent all the major OFCs.  Some also appear as RFCs in various lists, particularly Hong Kong, and Singapore.  They also appear on most lists of major tax havens, and on lists of the largest Conduit and Sink OFCs in the world.

 Amsterdam. Amsterdam is well known for the size of its pension fund market. It is also a centre for banking and trading activities. Amsterdam was a prominent financial centre in Europe in the 17th and 18th centuries and several of the innovations developed there were transported to London.  In June 2017, a study published in Nature ranked the Netherlands as the world's largest Conduit OFC, a term use to describe the re-routing of fund flows to tax havens. Additionally, after the UK's departure from the European Union, Amsterdam became Europe’s largest share trading centre.
 Dublin. Dublin (via its International Financial Services Centre, "IFSC"), is a specialised financial services centre with a focus on fund administration and domiciling, fund management, custodial activities and aircraft leasing. It is the largest securitisation location in the EU-27, and the second largest domicile for investment funds, particularly alternative investment funds, after Luxembourg. Many of the funds domiciled and managed in Dublin are at the instruction of investment managers in larger Asset Management jurisdictions such as London, Frankfurt, New York and Luxembourg.  Dublin's advanced BEPS tax tools, for example the double Irish, the single malt, and the capital allowances for intangible assets ("CAIA") tools, have led the economist Gabriel Zucman to judge Ireland to be the largest corporate tax haven by virtue of its use as a conduit OFC.
 Hong Kong. As a financial centre, Hong Kong has strong links with London and New York City. It developed its financial services industry while a British territory and its present legal system, defined in Hong Kong Basic Law, is based on English law. In 1997, Hong Kong became a Special Administrative Region of the People's Republic of China, retaining its laws and a high degree of autonomy for at least 50 years after the transfer. Recently, this formula has been threatened by interference of the Chinese central government (see also Hong Kong national security law and 2019 Hong Kong extradition bill). Most of the world's 100 largest banks have a presence in the city. Hong Kong is a leading location for initial public offerings, competing with New York City, and also for merger and acquisition activity.

 Luxembourg. Luxembourg is a specialised financial services centre that is the largest location for investment fund domiciliation in Europe, and second in the world after the United States. Many of the funds domiciled in Luxembourg are managed in London. Luxembourg is the leading private banking centre in the Eurozone and the largest captive reinsurance centre in Europe. 143 banks from 28 countries are established in Luxembourg. The country is also the third largest renminbi centre in the world by numbers, in certain activities such as deposits, loans, bond listing and investment funds. Three of the largest Chinese banks have their European hub in Luxembourg (ICBC, Bank of China, China Construction Bank).
 Singapore. With its strong links with London, Singapore has developed into the Asia region's largest centre for foreign exchange and commodity trading, as well as a growing wealth management hub. Other than Tokyo, it is one of the main centres for fixed income trading in Asia. However, the market capitalisation of its stock exchange has been falling since 2014 and several major companies plan to delist.
 Zurich. Zurich is a significant centre for banking, asset management including provision of alternative investment products, and insurance. Since Switzerland is not a member of the European Union, Zurich is not directly subject to EU regulation.

Major IMF RFCs

In some lists, RFCs such as Paris, Frankfurt, Chicago, and Shanghai appear as IFCs, however, they do not appear in all lists.  They are certainly major RFCs.

 Chicago. The Illinois city has the "world’s largest [exchange-traded] derivatives market" since the Chicago Mercantile Exchange and the Chicago Board of Trade merged in 2007, under the CME Group.

 Dubai. The second largest emirate in the United Arab Emirates is a growing centre for finance in the Middle East, including for Islamic finance. Its emergence as a financial centre is relatively recent, although commercial banking activity in the UAE became established in the second half of the 20th century (the first commercial bank in Dubai was British Bank of the Middle East in 1946, and the first domestic commercial bank was the National Bank of Dubai established in 1963).

 Frankfurt. Frankfurt attracts many foreign banks which maintain offices in the city. It is the seat of Deutsche Börse, one of the leading stock exchanges and derivatives markets operators, and the European Central Bank, which sets the monetary policy for the single European currency, the euro; in addition, in 2014 the European Central Bank took over responsibility for banking supervision for the 18 countries which form the Eurozone. It is also the seat of Deutsche Bundesbank, the German central bank, as well as of EIOPA, the EU's supervisory authority for insurances and occupational pension systems.

Frankfurt has been the financial centre of Germany since the second half of the 20th century as it was before the mid-19th century. Berlin held the position during the intervening period, focusing on lending to European countries while London focused on lending to the Americas and Asia.

 Madrid. Madrid is the headquarters to the Spanish company Bolsas y Mercados Españoles, which owns the four stock exchanges in Spain, the largest being the Bolsa de Madrid. Trading of equities, derivatives and fixed income securities are linked through the Madrid-based electronic Spanish Stock Market Interconnection System (SIBE), handling more than 90% of all financial transactions. Madrid ranks fourth in European equities market capitalisation, and Madrid's stock exchange is second in terms of number of listed companies, just behind New York Stock Exchange (NYSE plus NASDAQ). As a financial centre, Madrid has extensive links with Latin America and acts as a gateway for many Latin American financial firms to access the EU banking and financial markets.

 Milan. Italy's main centre of banking and finance. It hosts the Borsa Italiana stock exchange, one of the larger stock exchanges in Europe, which is now part of Euronext.

 Paris. Alongside equity trading on the Paris Stock Exchange, there is futures and options trading, insurance, corporate banking and asset management taking place in Paris. The city is home to the Banque de France and the European Securities and Markets Authority. Paris has been a major financial centre since the 19th century. The European Banking Authority is also moving to Paris in March 2019 following Brexit.
 Seoul. South Korea's capital has developed significantly as a financial centre since the late-2000s recession. In 2009, Seoul ranked 53rd among global financial centres; by 2012, Seoul had risen to number 9. Seoul has continued to build office space with the completion of the International Financial Center Seoul in 2013. It ranked 7th in the 2015 Global Financial Centres Index, recording the highest growth in rating among the top ten cities.
 Shanghai. Official efforts have been directed to making Pudong a financial leader by 2010. Efforts during the 1990s were mixed, but in the early 21st century, Shanghai gained ground. Factors such as a "protective banking sector" and a "highly restricted capital market" have held the city back, according to a 2009 opinion piece in China Daily. Shanghai has done well in terms of market capitalisation but it needs to "attract an army of money managers, lawyers, accountants, actuaries, brokers and other professionals, Chinese and foreign" to enable it to compete with New York and London. China is generating tremendous new capital, which makes it easier to stage initial public offerings of state-owned companies in places like Shanghai.

 Sydney. Australia's most populous city is a financial and business services hub not only for Australia but for the Asia-Pacific region. Sydney competes quite closely with other Asia Pacific hubs, however it concentrates a greater portion of Australian-based business in terms of clients and services. Sydney is home to two of Australia's four largest banks, the Commonwealth Bank of Australia and Westpac Banking Corporation, both headquartered in the Sydney CBD. Sydney is also home to 12 of the top 15 asset managers in Australia. Melbourne, on the other hand, tends to concentrate more of the Australian superannuation funds (pension funds). Sydney is using the large Barangaroo development project on its harbour to further position itself as an Asian Pacific hub. Sydney is also home to the Australian Securities Exchange and an array of brokerage banks which are either headquartered or regionally based in Sydney, including Australia's largest investment bank Macquarie Group.
 Toronto. The city is a leading market for Canada's largest financial institutions and large insurance companies. It has also become one of the fastest growing financial centres following the late-2000s recession, helped by the stability of the Canadian banking system. Most of the financial industry is concentrated along Bay Street, where the Toronto Stock Exchange is also located.
 Others. Mumbai is an emerging financial centre, which also provides international support services to London and other financial centres. Cities such as São Paulo, Mexico City and Johannesburg and other "would-be hubs" lack liquidity and the "skills base", according to one source. Financial industries in countries and regions such as the Indian subcontinent and Malaysia require not only well-trained people but the "whole institutional infrastructure of laws, regulations, contracts, trust and disclosure" which takes time to happen.

History
Primitive financial centres started in the 11th century in the Kingdom of England at the annual fair of St. Giles and in the Kingdom of Germany at the Frankfurt autumn fair, then developed in medieval France during the Champaign Fairs.

Italian city-states 

The first real international financial centre was the city state of Venice which slowly emerged from the 9th century to its peak in the 14th century. Tradable bonds as a commonly used type of security, were invented by the Italian city-states (such as Venice and Genoa) of the late medieval and early Renaissance periods while Florence can be said to be the birthplace of double-entry bookkeeping from the publication and proliferation of the work of Luca Pacioli.

The Low Countries 

In the sixteenth century, the overall economic supremacy of the Italian city-states gradually waned, and the centre of financial activities in Europe shifted to the Low Countries, first to Bruges, and later to Antwerp and Amsterdam which acted as Entrepôt cities. They also became important centres of financial innovation, capital accumulation and investment. By the early 1800s, London officially replaced Amsterdam as the world's leading financial centre.

19th–21st centuries

London and Paris were the world's only prominent financial centres throughout most of the 19th century. After 1870, Berlin and New York grew to become major financial centres mainly serving their national economies. An array of smaller international financial centres found market niches, such as Amsterdam, Brussels, Zurich, and Geneva. London was the leading international financial centre in the four decades before World War I. Since then, New York and London have developed leading positions in different activities and some non-Western financial centres have grown in prominence, notably Tokyo, Hong Kong, Singapore and Shanghai.

Rise of London

Rise of New York

Rise of Asian centres

In Asia, Tokyo emerged as a major financial centre in the 1980s as the Japanese economy became one of the largest in the world. Hong Kong and Singapore developed soon after leveraging their links with London and Britain. In the 21st century, other centres have grown including Toronto, Sydney, Seoul, Shanghai and Astana. Astana International Financial Centre has become the fastest growing financial hub in Central Asia. Dubai has become a centre for finance in the Middle East, including for Islamic finance. The rapid rise of India has enabled Mumbai to become an emerging financial centre. India is also making an International Financial Centre GIFT City from scratch. GIFT city is now functional and has already won the crown of fastest emerging International Finance Centre of South Asia. Linked to the rise of these new IFCs, has seen the rise of "partner OFCs" (offshore tax-havens to which funds are routed), such as Taiwan (a major Sink OFC for Asia, and 7th largest global Sink OFC), Mauritius (a major Sink OFC for South Asia, especially India, and Africa, and the 9th largest global Sink OFC).

The private nationwide financial system in China was first developed by the Shanxi merchants, with the creation of so-called "draft banks". The first draft bank Rishengchang was created in 1823 in Pingyao. Some large draft banks had branches in Russia, Mongolia and Japan to facilitate the international trade. Throughout the nineteenth century, the central Shanxi region became the de facto financial centres of Qing China. With the fall of Qing Dynasty, the financial centres gradually shifted to Shanghai, mainly due to its geographical location at the estuary of the Yangtze River and to the control of customs in China. After the establishment of People's Republic of China, the financial centres in China today are Beijing, Shanghai, and Shenzhen.

See also 
 Global city
 Corporate tax haven
 Financial capital
 Financial Development Index
 Geography of finance
 Global financial system
 Nylonkong
 Conduit and Sink OFCs
 Financial district

Notes

References

External links
 International Financial Centres – news articles from The Banker magazine.
 Financial Centres International – a forum on developments in international financial services centres.
 Financial Centre Futures – research on global financial centres from the  Z/Yen Group.

International finance
 
Offshore finance
Foreign exchange market